Statistics of Copenhagen Football Championship in the 1906/1907 season.

Overview
It was contested by 5 teams, and Kjøbenhavns Boldklub won the championship.

League standings

References
Denmark - List of final tables (RSSSF)

1906–07 in Danish football
Top level Danish football league seasons
Copenhagen Football Championship seasons
Denmark